Burane is a town in the southeastern Shabeellaha Dhexe province of Somalia. It is located in the Jowhar District.

"Burane" is a town in Somalia. Buurane is situated nearby to the village Ceynte and the locality Xudur-Ciise.

Demographic
The broader Burane town has a total population of 18,938 residents. The town is primarily inhabited by the Hawaadle  clan.

Places near Buurane
Ceynte - Cali Deer - Axmed cigoow - Bannaan - Barre cali xasan - Barrey - Beerta siyago - Buulo madina - Buurfuule - Cabbaas - Cabdulle xabad  - Dabeylley - Garsaalley - Gumar gaalo - Gumarrey -

References
Completed & Planned Infrastructure Rehabilitation South Somalia Projects 2010

Populated places in Middle Shabelle